Walter Taylor (1901–?) was an English footballer who played as an outside right. Born in Manchester, he played for New Mills and Manchester United, who signed him for a fee of £25 in December 1921. After just two weeks with the club, he made his Football League debut on 2 January 1922, in a 3–0 defeat away to Sheffield United. It was his only appearance for Manchester United, and he was released on a free transfer in April 1922.

References

External links
Profile at StretfordEnd.co.uk
Profile at MUFCInfo.com

1901 births
Year of death missing
English footballers
Manchester United F.C. players
New Mills A.F.C. players
Association football forwards